Saint Asterius may refer to:

Asterius of Caesarea (d. 282), Roman senator who became a Christian martyr
Asterius of Amasea (c. 350 – c. 410 AD), Bishop of Amasea between 380 and 390